Xiaolin Showdown is an American animated television series that aired on Kids' WB and was created by Christy Hui. Set in a world where martial arts battles and Eastern magic are commonplace, the series follows Omi, Raimundo, Kimiko, and Clay, four young Xiaolin warriors in training who, alongside their dragon companion Dojo, battle the Heylin forces of evil, especially series antagonists Jack Spicer, Wuya, and Chase Young. The Xiaolin warriors set to accomplish this by protecting Shen Gong Wu, a set of ancient artifacts that have great magical powers, from villains who could use them to conquer the world. Typical episodes revolve around a specific Shen Gong Wu and the resulting race on both sides to find it. Episodes often climax with one good and one evil character challenging one another to a magical duel called a Xiaolin Showdown for possession of the artifact.

Originally premiering on the Kids' WB block of programming on The WB on November 1, 2003, the series ran for 3 seasons with 52 episodes before its conclusion on May 13, 2006. Reruns aired on Cartoon Network from 2006 to 2007 and on Boomerang from 2015 to 2018. Xiaolin Showdown was a ratings hit for Kids' WB and led to the licensing of spin-off media including DVD releases, a trading card game, and a video game. The series won a Daytime Emmy Award in 2005 and was nominated for three additional Daytime Emmy Awards, one Annie Award, and one Golden Reel Award.

Follow-up series Xiaolin Chronicles previewed on August 26, 2013, on Disney XD and began its long-term run on September 14 the same year. The show aired for twenty episodes from August 26, 2013 to March 6, 2014 on Disney XD, leaving the last six episodes unaired in the United States until July 1, 2015, when Chronicles was made available to watch on Netflix.

Production

Xiaolin Showdown was created by Christy Hui and co-produced by executive producer Sander Schwartz, supervising producer Eric Radomski and producers Bill Motz and Bob Roth and composed by Kevin Manthei, it was additionally developed by Warner Bros. Animation. The first episode of Xiaolin Showdown was developed over three years following its conception, and premiered November 1, 2003.

Series creator Christy Hui has stated that despite the growing popularity of anime in the United States, she preferred to create a show that was a "fusion of Eastern and Western culture". Xiaolin Showdown shows subtle influences of Eastern art, action, and philosophy, but also includes very Western characters and humor. Dong Yang Animation Co., LTD, Digital eMation, and Lotto Animation contributed some of the animation for this series.

Following the success of its first season, a 26-episode season 2 was ordered. A third season would follow, resulting in 3 seasons and 52 episodes. The series received promotion in other media, including Postopia, a trading card game, and a video game.

The series was followed by Xiaolin Chronicles, which premiered on August 26, 2013. Actress Tara Strong strongly hinted via Twitter that episodes were being produced, which was confirmed by fellow series star Grey DeLisle when she appeared on the March 9, 2012, episode of actor Rob Paulsen's podcast, and by series creator Christy Hui in her Facebook account.

Plot

Season one
Four young monks – Omi, Kimiko, Raimundo, and Clay – are forced into cooperation at the Xiaolin Temple after learning they are chosen to become Xiaolin Dragons. They become friends and work together traveling the world in search for Shen Gong Wu, mystical objects with powers that balance the forces of good and evil. Along the way, they must battle wannabe evil boy genius Jack Spicer, and the evil Heylin sorceress Wuya, whom Jack inadvertently frees from a 1500-year imprisonment in a puzzle box by Grand Master Dashi. Through thievery, Spicer ultimately possesses enough Shen Gong Wu to form Mala Mala Jong, an ancient monster that Wuya uses to help her gain control of the world. Raimundo defies orders and fights the monster, causing the remaining monks to fight and defend the remaining Shen Gong Wu in the Temple's possession. All the monks, except for Raimundo, are promoted to Xiaolin Apprentices. Angered, Raimundo joins the Heylin side and helps Wuya regain her human form.

Season two
Omi travels back in time and receives a second puzzle box from Grand Master Dashi, who trapped Wuya in the puzzle box 1500 years ago. But with no way back to the future, he freezes himself using the Orb of Tornami. In the present time, Omi breaks free of the ice with the puzzle box in hand. Raimundo decides that his rightful place belongs in the Xiaolin Temple with his friends and traps Wuya in the new puzzle box. After returning to the Temple, the monks continue their search for the Shen Gong Wu. Eventually, Raimundo is promoted to Xiaolin Apprentice.

Afterwards, the monks are introduced to Xiaolin monk-turned-evil villain Chase Young. Chase takes an interest in Omi and becomes determined to manipulate his mind into joining the Heylin side. When Master Fung becomes trapped in the Ying-Yang World, Omi asks for help from Chase. He succeeds in rescuing Master Fung; however, upon leaving the Ying-Yang world, his bad chi takes over and he joins the Heylin side. Chase succeeds in restoring Wuya to her human form, though he takes her powers. The remaining monks soon learn that Chase had sent Master Fung into the Ying-Yang World knowing the events that would unfold afterwards, including Omi joining his side.

Season three
Raimundo, Kimiko and Clay travel to the Ying-Yang World to retrieve Omi's good chi and return him to the Xiaolin side. After gaining Omi back, the monks are promoted to Wudai Warriors. They are then introduced to Hannibal Bean, an evil villain from the Ying-Yang World who is responsible for turning Chase Young to the Heylin side.

Toward the end of their journey, Master Fung tells the monks that they have one final quest before the team's leader, the Shoku Warrior, will be revealed. Omi decides that he will stop Hannibal Bean from turning Chase to the Heylin side. He ends up freezing himself in order to travel to the future to find the Sands of Time. Through time travel, he succeeds by switching the Lao Mang Long Soup with pea soup. However, when he returns to his present time, he learns that his actions have made things worse: instead of Chase joining the Heylin side, it is Chase's former friend, Master Monk Guan, whom Hannibal Bean turns evil. The monks and Chase are captured by Hannibal Bean, Wuya, and the evil Guan; Chase sacrifices his good self to save the monks and give them the opportunity to fight and return everything to the way it was. The monks succeed, and the timeline is fixed.

In the end, Raimundo is revealed as the Shoku Warrior. The series concludes with every villain attacking the temple, and the Wudai Warriors led by Raimundo proceeding to counterattack.

Characters
Xiaolin Showdown features a large cast, many of whom only appear in one episode and occasionally return for cameos or for single episodes later in the series. While the supporting characters are often one-dimensional and serve an immediate purpose in the episode in which they appear, the main characters are often well-developed with strengths and minor flaws that become present as the series progresses.

Main characters
 Omi (voiced by Tara Strong) – The Xiaolin Dragon of Water, Omi is the main protagonist of the series and was the first dragon-in-training to train with Master Fung. At times Omi can be selfish and boastful, and often learns lessons of humility. Having been raised in the monastery, he is naïve about the outside world. As a running gag, Omi routinely confuses idiomatic phrases, from simple changes to lacking any resemblance to the original phrase whatsoever. Omi's signature moves are Tsunami Strike-Water, Tornado Strike-Water, and Wudai-Neptune Water. His Wudai Weapon is the Shimo Staff, and his elemental Shen Gong Wu is the Kaijin Charm. His preferred Shen Gong Wu is the Orb of Tornami (referred to as the Orb of Torpedo in Chronicles) as it is a water Shen Gong Wu. He turned evil when he returned from the Ying-Yang world to join Chase Young on the Heylin side. He receives Master Monk Guan's famous Spear of Guan.
 Raimundo Pedrosa (voiced by Tom Kenny) – The Xiaolin Dragon of Wind, Raimundo is stubborn and self-centered, but also does anything to protect his friends. Raimundo is street-smart and the group's self-proclaimed rebel, later becoming the leader of the group. He comes from Rio de Janeiro in Brazil. He joins the Heylin side twice in the series (once out of envy of the success of his friends, and a second time as a ploy to take Shen Gong Wu and the Treasure of the Blind Swordsman from Hannibal Roy Bean). He receives a copy of Master Monk Guan's favorite Spear of Guan. Raimundo's signature moves are Typhoon Boom-Wind and Wudai-Star Wind. His preferred Shen Gong Wu is the Sword of the Storm (referred to as the Sword of Lucida in Chronicles). His Wudai Weapon is the Blade of the Nebula, and his elemental Shen Gong Wu is the Crest of the Condor. He is named Shoku Warrior in the final episode.
 Kimiko Tohomiko (voiced by Grey DeLisle) – The Xiaolin Dragon of Fire, Kimiko Tohomiko is the sole female member of the team. Kimiko is the most tech-savvy member of the team and comes from Japan. Kimiko also changes hairstyles and outfits in almost every episode. Kimiko's signature moves are Judolette Flip-Fire and Wudai-Mars Fire. Her preferred Shen Gong Wu is the Star Hanabi (referred to as the Hanabi Star in Chronicles), her Wudai Weapon is the Arrow Sparrow, and her elemental Shen Gong Wu is the Cat's Eye Draco. She has the shortest temper, generally at even the slightest provocation. She can however be extremely focused and ignore outer, annoying distractions. This is evidenced when she wields the Tangle Web Comb, said by Master Fung to require high levels of concentration.
 Clay Bailey (voiced by Jeff Bennett) – The Xiaolin Dragon of Earth, Clay is the team muscle and a homegrown Texas cowboy. Clay sometimes speaks in "cowboy slang", and uses metaphors. Because of his good gentleman manners, he never fights girls. He also has a bad case of stage fright. His large size and sensible demeanor belittle his good-humored and gentle nature. The only time he gets really mad is if someone takes or destroys his beloved cowboy hat. Clay has a sister named Jessie who is an outlaw and leader of the Black Vipers. Clay's signature moves are Seismic Kick-Earth and Wudai-Crater Earth. His preferred Shen Gong Wu are the Fist of Tebigong (referred to as the Fist of the Iron Bear in Chronicles) and the Third-Arm Sash. His Wudai Weapon is the Big Bang Meteorang, and his elemental Shen Gong Wu is the Longhorn Taurus.
 Dojo Kanojo Cho (voiced by Wayne Knight) – A shapeshifting Chinese dragon. The Xiaolin warriors' main mode of transportation and wise-cracking advisor, Dojo can sense Shen Gong Wu. He has no hind legs and is normally about 1.5 feet long, but when the situation requires it, he can shift into a full-sized 40-foot dragon. He has served Grand Master Dashi. Dojo is often seen around Clay in the show; hanging around his arm, sitting on his shoulder or inside his cowboy hat or around Omi, Raimundo, Kimiko and Master Fung. When Dojo is out of commission, the Xiaolin Warriors use an aircraft Shen Gong Wu called the Silver Manta Ray, or the other transport Shen Gong Wu such as the Crouching Cougar, the Shen-Ga-Roo, or the Tunnel Armadillo.
 Jack Spicer (voiced by Danny Cooksey) – The Xiaolin Warriors' first nemesis. Jack Spicer is notable for his robotic engineering, long rants, overuse of the word "evil" and his repetitive self-proclamation of "evil boy genius". He is responsible for releasing Wuya from the puzzle box that Grand Master Dashi locked her in, and aids her in finding Shen Gong Wu to conquer the world. Jack has aided the Xiaolin Warriors on occasion, and does show occasional leanings toward good. However, he always winds up back on the evil side. As a reflection of his character, his preferred Shen Gong Wu is the Monkey Staff (referred to as the Monkey Sphere in Chronicles), which was the only Shen Gong Wu he is left with at the end of the series.
 Wuya (voiced by Susan Silo) – A 1500-year-old Heylin witch who serves as the principal antagonist to the Xiaolin. After being imprisoned in a puzzle box by Grand Master Dashi for 1,500 years, Wuya's physical form was destroyed. Her goal is to use the Shen Gong Wu to regain a tangible body along with her magical powers, which happens at the end of season one with the help of Raimundo, the Serpent's Tail and the Reversing Mirror and with the help of Chase Young in season two and season three. She, like Dojo, has the ability to sense a Shen Gong Wu's appearance, but does not need the Scroll of the Shen Gong Wu to determine what it does. At one point she leaves Jack to take on Raimundo as a partner, but after much debate he returns to the path of good.
 Chase Young (voiced by Jason Marsden) – A villain introduced in the second season as an even bigger evil threat than Jack. He himself was turned to the Heylin side when Hannibal Bean convinced him to drink the Lao Mang Long Soup in return for remaining forever young. Chase Young controls an army of therianthropic warriors, trapped in the form of jungle cats, and has the ability to shapeshift into a humanoid lizard-like creature. Chase rarely uses Shen Gong Wu in battle since he claims it distracts him from honing his martial arts skills. During the second season of the show, Chase plots to turn Omi to the Heylin side as part of a plot to rule the world. He succeeds, but later releases Omi as a matter of honor.

Supporting characters
 Master Fung (voiced by René Auberjonois in season 1 and Maurice LaMarche in seasons 2–3) The Xiaolin Warrior's Master, trainer, and guide, Master Fung is mortified by his charges' behavior at times. He also is nearly always calm, despite the Warriors' behavior and mistakes.
 Master Monk Guan (voiced by Jeff Bennett) – A legendary tai chi master who has traveled the world a dozen times, and has defeated many opponents using only his famous Spear of Guan which was later given to Omi (his favorite copy of the Spear of Guan was given to Raimundo). He makes his first appearance in the series by trading Dojo to Chase Young, who intended to use him in his Lau Mang Long soup, to get his Spear of Guan back. He also aids the young monks in combat training. He has his own temple on a cliffside near the ocean, where the young monks stay and store Shen Gong Wu while he trains them.
 Grandmaster Dashi (voiced by Tom Kenny) – The grandmaster Xiaolin monk, who imprisoned Wuya in a puzzle box 1500 years ago. He appeared along Dojo when Omi traveled to the past, seeking a second puzzle box. He was friends with Master Monk Guan and Chase Young, and met Omi when he assisted the three in the battle against Wuya.
 Hannibal Roy Bean (voiced by Tom Kenny) – Hannibal is a small, bean-shaped demon with a southern accent, who spends his time plotting evil and world domination. He is first shown imprisoned in the Ying-Yang world by Chase Young, but tricks the Xiaolin warriors into releasing him. His "primary" Shen Gong Wu is the Moby Morpher, which he uses to shapeshift into other forms and change size, and travels on his bird, Ying-Ying.

Mystical elements

Shen Gong Wu
The focus of the series is on collecting the fictional Shen Gong Wu, mystical artifacts that have magical powers, activated by saying the artifact's name aloud. Wuya's release caused Shen Gong Wu to reveal themselves. They are primarily used in Xiaolin Showdowns. The first Xiaolin Showdown was between Grand Master Dashi and Wuya. It was a great battle, in which Dashi used the Shen Gong Wu against Wuya's Heylin magic. Eventually, Grand Master Dashi was the victor, and Wuya was trapped within a mystical puzzle box. Determined to ensure that Wuya would not be able to get her hands on the Shen Gong Wu and rule the world with them, Grand Master Dashi and the dragon Dojo hid them all over the world. Dashi then created the Xiaolin Temple and began a lineage of Xiaolin Warriors to prevent the Shen Gong Wu from falling into the wrong hands. Should Wuya ever be freed, the Xiaolin Warriors would rise up and fight the forces of the Heylin.

A Shen Gong Wu can only be located when it chooses to reveal itself, at that point both Wuya and Dojo can sense its activation and can find its general location. Wuya can tell what Shen Gong Wu has revealed itself, while the Xiaolin must defer to the Ancient Scroll of the Shen Gong Wu to find out which one has been revealed. Chase Young is also capable of anticipating when a new Shen Gong Wu is revealed.

There are two occasions during which astronomical events affect the Shen Gong Wu. When the planets align themselves, the Shen Gong Wu gather to form Mala Mala Jong. When the rare Heylin Comet flies over Earth, the Shen Gong Wu come alive and take over their user. Raimundo was subject to the Heylin Comet's magic in the episode "The Last Temptation of Raimundo", and he was taken over by the Golden Tiger Claws, Third Arm Sash, Helmet of Jong and many other Shen Gong Wu. He was mutated into a giant freakish brute until the comet had passed, and it was safe to take the Shen Gong Wu off.

In Xiaolin Chronicles, many Shen Gong Wu are redesigned and even renamed, such as the Orb of Tornami, Sword of the Storm, Fist of Tebigong, and Monkey Staff.

Xiaolin Showdowns
In Xiaolin Showdown, when more than one person grabs a Shen Gong Wu at the same time, a Xiaolin Showdown occurs. In this namesake competition, each side wagers a Shen Gong Wu he/she already owns. In some cases, the competitors invoke a Shen Yi Bu Dare, where multiple (usually two) Shen Gong Wu are wagered. The winner obtains all the Shen Gong Wu fought for, totaling five Shen Gong Wu. In some cases, when more than two people touch a Shen Gong Wu at once, a different kind of Xiaolin Showdown occurs: the Showdown Trio is a two-on-one or three-person free-for-all, a Xiaolin Showdown Tsunami is either a two-on-two or a four-person free-for-all Showdown, and an Eight-Way Xiaolin Showdown is a four-on-four Showdown. One can also call for a Cosmic Clash Showdown, allowing the caller to bring more people into the Showdown, who did not touch the Shen Gong Wu (however, in this type of showdown, one of the competitors must be over one-half Shen Gong Wu and look kind of freakish). Generally, the competitors in a Xiaolin Showdown of any type use the Shen Gong Wu that they wagered to compete with. However, there have been instances where a Shen Gong Wu not wagered was used in the Xiaolin Showdown, as in "The Last Temptation of Raimundo" when Wuya used the Shroud of Shadows against the Xiaolin Warriors while she was possessing Raimundo. Another showdown was in "Enter The Dragon" when Omi uses the Reversing Mirror and Shroud of Shadows on Dojo.

The challenge in a Xiaolin Showdown can be anything, but most commonly is some sort of race to the Shen Gong Wu. When the Showdown is called, the world warps around the competitors and bystanders, and the terrain they are on becomes an extreme extent, such as a mountainside becoming a field of rock pillars, or a snowfield becoming a large snowboarding course. Some Showdowns have also affected those involved, such as gaining weight for a sumo wrestling showdown. Other contests have been games of tag, basketball, or combat. The challenge officially begins after the change, and when both (or all) combatants yell "Gong Yi Tanpai!" then the decided contest starts. When one is victorious, the terrain returns to normal, and the winner gains possession of all the wagered Shen Gong Wu.

"Gong Yi Tanpai!" is a pseudo-Chinese way of saying, "Ready, Set, Go!".

Omi inadvertently gave the competition its name when he traveled back in time in the episode "Days Past" to ask Grand Master Dashi to make another puzzle box to imprison Wuya.

Episodes

Reception

Critical reception
Xiaolin Showdown was a huge hit for the Kids WB network and it ranked at the no.1 position against all other Saturday morning competition mainly between kids aged 6–14.

Awards and nominations

In other media

Home media
Warner Bros. released a two-disc Season 1 DVD on February 20, 2007. On January 10, 2017, after Amazon acquired the rights to produce home media releases for the series, both a reprint of the Season 1 DVD and a complete Season 2 DVD were released in manufacture-on-demand format. On April 11, 2017, Season 3 was also given a manufacture-on-demand release.

All seasons of Xiaolin Showdown as well as the spin-off series Xiaolin Chronicles are available on Amazon Prime Video and iTunes in high definition.

Trading card game
Wizards of the Coast released a now out-of-print trading card game based on the series in 2005.

Video game
Konami developed a Xiaolin Showdown video game that was released on November 14, 2006, for PlayStation 2, PlayStation Portable, Xbox, and Nintendo DS.

Successor series
On September 14, 2013, a successor series, Xiaolin Chronicles, premiered. Chronicles features a new ally of the main characters named Ping Pong as they continue their fight against Wuya, Jack Spicer and Chase Young.

References

External links

 

 
Anime-influenced Western animated television series
Martial arts television series
2000s American animated television series
2003 American television series debuts
2006 American television series endings
American children's animated action television series
American children's animated adventure television series
American children's animated science fantasy television series
Television series by Warner Bros. Animation
Kids' WB original shows
The WB original programming
Treasure hunt television series
Television shows adapted into video games
Shaolin Temple in fiction
English-language television shows
Japan in non-Japanese culture